The 1986 MTV Video Music Awards aired live on September 5, 1986, honoring the best music videos from May 2, 1985, to May 1, 1986. The show was hosted by MTV VJs Downtown Julie Brown, Mark Goodman, Alan Hunter, Martha Quinn, and Dweezil Zappa, and it emanated primarily from both The Palladium in New York City and the Universal Amphitheatre in Los Angeles. Other parts of the show, however, took place in various locations such as London, Miami, and New Haven, Connecticut.

The night's biggest winner and one of the year's two most nominated artists was Norwegian group a-ha, which won eight out of eleven awards it was in contention for.  Their video for "Take On Me" earned six awards out of eight nominations, including Viewer's Choice, while "The Sun Always Shines on T.V." won two awards out of three nominations.

The other most nominated artist was rock group Dire Straits, whose video for "Money for Nothing" also earned eleven nominations and won two awards, including Video of the Year.  Thus, "Money for Nothing" was also the most nominated video at the 1986 VMAs.

Background
MTV announced in June that the 1986 Video Music Awards would be held at New York's Palladium and Los Angeles's Universal Amphitheatre on September 5. Nominees were announced on August 4. The decision to broadcast the ceremony from multiple venues came out of a desire to make the ceremony more casual, as did the decisions to forego a traditional host, present awards throughout the venues instead of at a podium, and loosen time limitations. Winners were selected by a group of over 1,700 individuals from the recording industry. The ceremony was preceded by a two-hour MTV VMA 1986 Pre-Game Show special. Hosted by Bob Costas and Huey Lewis, the pre-taped special highlighted the nominees.

Performances

Robert Palmer, The Monkees, INXS, Mr. Mister, Whitney Houston, and Pet Shop Boys performed from Los Angeles. The Hooters, 'Til Tuesday, Simply Red, and Tina Turner performed from New York.

Presenters
 Jay Leno – presented Best Stage Performance in a Video
 Joe Davola and Alan Hunter – talked about the Viewer's Choice award and introduced the nominees
 Janet Jackson – presented Best Choreography in a Video
 Bobcat Goldthwait – presented Best Concept Video
 Steven Wright – introduced the winners of Best Editing in a Video and Best Cinematography in a Video
 Don Johnson – presented Best Female Video
 The Bangles – presented Best Overall Performance in a Video
 Robert Palmer – presented the Video Vanguard Award to Madonna
 Pet Shop Boys – presented the Video Vanguard Award to Zbigniew Rybczyński
 Bananarama – introduced the winner of Best Art Direction in a Video
 Martha Quinn – presented the Special Recognition Award to Jack Healey
 Whitney Houston – presented Best Male Video
 Steve Winwood – presented Best Direction in a Video
 Gilbert Gottfried – introduced the winner of Best Special Effects in a Video
 David Lee Roth – presented Best Group Video
 Elvira, Mistress of the Dark – introduced the world premiere of Don Johnson's video for "Heartbeat"
 Bob Costas – introduced a segment on the ties between sports and music called "Rock 'n Roll Sports"
 Belinda Carlisle – presented Best New Artist in a Video
 Robin Williams – presented the Special Recognition Award to Bill Graham
 Paul McCartney – introduced Tina Turner
 Mötley Crüe (Vince Neil and Tommy Lee) – presented Most Experimental Video
 Van Halen – presented Viewer's Choice
 Don Henley – presented Video of the Year

Winners and nominees
Winners are listed first and highlighted in bold.

Other appearances
 Adam Whittaker – accepted the Best Editing and Best Cinematography awards on behalf of David Yardley and Oliver Stapleton
 Grace Jones – accepted the Best Overall Performance award on behalf of David Bowie and Mick Jagger
 Simon Fields – accepted the Best Direction award on behalf of Steve Barron
 Rod Stewart – appeared in a pre-commercial vignette via satellite

References

External links
 Official MTV site

1986
MTV Video Music Awards
MTV Video Music Awards
1986 in Los Angeles